Father Virgil Cordano O.F.M. (December 3, 1919 – May 22, 2008) was the long-time pastor of the Santa Barbara Mission.

Biography
Born to a Catholic Italian immigrant family in Sacramento, California, Father Cordano came to Santa Barbara, California in 1934 to study at the adjacent St. Anthony's Seminary at the Santa Barbara Mission, then the primary training ground in California for the Franciscan Order (Friars Minor, or OFM).  Except for graduate work at The Catholic University of America, Washington, D.C., Cordano spent his entire career at the Santa Barbara Mission. He was chosen to be the official Santa Barbara greeter of Queen Elizabeth II during her 1983 visit to the town.

Father Cordano died at age 89 on May 22, 2008.

Distinctions and awards
The Virgil Cordano Chair for Catholic Studies and the Virgil Cordano, OFM, Endowment in Catholic Studies at the University of California Santa Barbara (UCSB) is named in honor of Fr. Cordano.  Professor Ann Taves, PhD, currently serves as the Virgil Cordano Chair of Catholic Studies.

References

1919 births
2008 deaths
American people of Italian descent
People from Sacramento, California
People from Santa Barbara, California
Priests of the Spanish missions in California
American Roman Catholic missionaries
Catholic University of America alumni
Roman Catholic missionaries in the United States
Catholics from California